Todd Graham is a Canadian comedian and filmmaker best known for creating the acclaimed short film, Apocalypse Pooh.

Early life and education
Graham was born in Peterborough, Ontario, and attended OCAD University in Toronto.

Career

Stand-up comedy 
Graham has performed at the Winnipeg Comedy Festival, JFL 42, and Just For Laughs. His Just for Laughs: All Access show was nominated in 2017 for Best Taped Live Performance at the Canadian Comedy Awards. His debut album, Bustin' Loose!, was released on Comedy Records in 2019 and supported by a record store tour throughout Toronto. Todd is part of Comedy Records' roster and was featured on the label's 10 Year Anniversary album.

Film 
In 1987, Graham created the 8-minute film Apocalypse Pooh. It is considered by many to be one of the earliest examples of a mashup video and combines footage from Disney's Winnie the Pooh shorts (by Wolfgang Reitherman, released between 1966 and 1977) with audio from Francis Ford Coppola's 1979 film Apocalypse Now. At emphatic moments, the juxtaposition is reversed, with Coppola's images accompanying Reitherman's soundtrack. It was screened at Toronto's Pleasure Dome art forum in 1992, and showcased in New York City at the Whitney Museum and The Kitchen. Ken Newman of Sight & Sound praised the film for being "brilliantly edited".  Scott Mackenzie of CineAction wrote in 2007 that the film was exemplary of the new avant garde, "a potent synthesis of the radical politics of the 1960s and 1970s with character animation Hollywood cinema at its most surreal and uncanny" as a vehicle to examine the "horror and allure [of the Vietnam War] in mainstream cinema".  He also noted that the film came at a time when "barriers between media were disintegrating" and called it "the godparent of today's mash-ups".
Because the piece violated copyright laws in splicing source materials together it could never be given a genuine commercial presentation. The film is considered an underground cult movie whose reputation is based solely on the depth and scope of the bootleg video circuit. A digitally remastered version was completed and released online by producer Brad Bell in 2010.

See also
Comedy Records
List of Canadian stand-up comedians

References

External links
The Horror, Piglet, the horror – Sample of 2007 critical analysis of Apocalypse Pooh at CineAction
Apocalypse Pooh at the Internet Movie Database.

Canadian stand-up comedians
Comedians from Ontario
People from Peterborough, Ontario
Living people
1965 births